Neandra marginicollis is a species of long-horned beetle in the family Cerambycidae. It is found in North America.

Subspecies
These two subspecies belong to the species Neandra marginicollis:
 Neandra marginicollis marginicollis Schaeffer, 1929
 Neandra marginicollis punctillata Schaeffer, 1929

References

Further reading

 
 

Parandrinae
Articles created by Qbugbot
Beetles described in 1929